Spooky, Spooky (Chinese: 鬼掹腳 Gui meng jiao, literally: "Come Join Us"), also known as The Haunted Island and Spooky, Spooky, Spooky, is a 1988 Hong Kong comedy horror film directed and co-produced by Sammo Hung. The executive producer was Leonard Ho. The film was released theatrically on 19 October 1988.

Plot
In the time of the Qing dynasty, a woman is caught in an adulterous embrace with a man. The man is drowned in a cage while the grieving woman falls into a pit of quicksand and dies. Years later in 1988, recent police academy graduate Wang Hsiao Ming is newly posted as a policeman in West Bay, also known as "Ghost Bay", under Sectional Chief Lu Hsien, nicknamed "Master" due to his old age. During his first morning on the job they are called to investigate a woman's corpse that has washed ashore. They are joined by new posting Chief Inspector Chen. Chief Coroner Chen Ta-wen, also known as "Queency", suggests that they get help from the larger East Bay police department.

Hsiao Ming attempts to raise the red flag to prevent beachgoers from entering the water, causing an uproar among the locals. New posting Sgt. Pai arrives with a stern attitude, slapping Hsiao Ming when he tells her to help him raise the red flag. The ghost of the dead woman develops feelings for Hsiao Ming and slaps Sgt. Pai out of vengeance.

Hsiao Ming's old neighbor Miss Wang, a schoolteacher, has brought her class to the beach. Unable to enter the water, they instead create a time capsule. The student "Fatty" enters the water and goes missing, causing panic among the other students. The ghost of the dead woman possesses Miss Wang and battles Sgt. Pai. The fight is broken up by Hsiao Ming and Lu Hsien, who then shoots the ghost with vermillion bullets when she attacks him.

As Queency leads Hsiao Ming, Lu Hsien, and Sgt. Pai on a search for clues, the ghost possesses Chief Inspector Chen. Lu Hsien stops the ghost from moving with a charm written on joss paper. They transport Chief Inspector Chen's body to the East Bay Police Station, where the ghost possesses policemen there and ultimately Hsiao Ming himself.

Cast
Alfred Cheung as Wang Hsiao Ming
Wu Ma as Lu Hsien
Joyce Godenzi as Sgt. Pai
Fat Cheung as Chen Ta-wen a.k.a. Queency
Anthony Chan as Chief Inspector Chen
Tina Lau as Miss Wang
Richard Ng as East Bay Station Commander
Yuen Wah as East Bay Sergeant
Mars as Mars
Billy Lau as Four Eyes
Corey Yuen as Egghead
Pauline Yuk-Wan Wong as Quicksand Ghost
Yip Wing-cho as Village Head
Hui Ying-ying as Villager
Yu Mo-lin as Villager
Yuen Woo-ping as Villager
Kwan Shiu-leung as Fatty
Sabrina Ho as Student
James Tien as Master Tien

Reception
The website sogoodreviews.com calls the film "a Sammo Hung effort with ambitions to provide actual horror and tension, in addition to the comedy" and adds that "the movie is very funny when needed."

Reviewer MovieMadness gave the film a rating of 7/10, calling it "a typical 1980s HK ghost vehicle" with "entertaining lively horror and slapstick".

Topo Sanchez of scumcinema.com included the film in his list of "Top 10 Hong Kong Horror Classics on YouTube".

References

External links
 
 Spooky Spooky at HKCinemagic
 

1988 films
1980s comedy horror films
1980s ghost films
Hong Kong comedy horror films
Hong Kong ghost films
1980s Cantonese-language films
Films directed by Sammo Hung
Films shot in Hong Kong
1980s Hong Kong films